The Twilight Derby is a Grade II American Thoroughbred horse race for three years olds over the distance of one-and-one-eighth miles on the turf scheduled annually in October at Santa Anita Park in Arcadia, California.  The event currently carries a purse of $200,000.

History

The event was named for Elias Jackson "Lucky" Baldwin's 1885 American Derby winner, Volante, who was ridden to victory by jockey Isaac Burns Murphy. Lucky Baldwin had built the original Santa Anita Racetrack Track in 1907 and Volante was buried at the track.

When the grading of races began as a Thoroughbred Owners and Breeders Association project in 1973 the event was classified as Grade III, however, the event was not held that year due to a strike by pari-mutual clerks.

In 1988 and 1989 the event was upgraded to Grade II before returning to Grade III.
In 1996 the event was one again upgraded to Grade II.

In 1997 the event was renamed to the Oak Tree Derby after the Oak Tree Racing Association.
 In 2012 with the Oak Tree Racing Association abandoning the Santa Anita Track the event was renamed to the Twilight Derby.

The event has been held on the undercard of the Saturday Breeders' Cup card in 2008, 2009, 2016 and 2019.

Records
Time record:
 1:44.48 – The Usual Q.T. (2009)

Margins: 
  lengths - Daytona (IRE) (2007)

Most wins by an owner:
 2 – Charles E. Whittingham (1977, 1979)

Most wins by a jockey:
 6 – Gary Stevens (1986, 1990, 1998, 1999, 2015, 2017)
 
Most wins by a trainer:
 5 – Charles E. Whittingham (1969, 1974, 1977, 1979, 1989)

Winners

Legend:

 

Notes:

§ Ran as an entry

‡ In 1973 the Volante Handicap was scheduled to be held on Saturday, 7 October 1973, opening day of the Oak Tree Racing Association's meeting at Santa Anita but was cancelled due to a three-day strike by the pari-mutuel clerks.

See also
List of American and Canadian Graded races

References

Horse races in California
Santa Anita Park
Graded stakes races in the United States
Grade 2 stakes races in the United States
Flat horse races for three-year-olds
Turf races in the United States
Recurring sporting events established in 1969
1969 establishments in California